The name Ignacio has been used for eight tropical cyclones in the Eastern Pacific Ocean.
 Hurricane Ignacio (1979)
 Hurricane Ignacio (1985)
 Tropical Storm Ignacio (1991)
 Tropical Storm Ignacio (1997)
 Hurricane Ignacio (2003) – Made landfall on the southern Gulf of California coast of Baja California.
 Tropical Storm Ignacio (2009)
 Hurricane Ignacio (2015)
 Tropical Storm Ignacio (2021)

Pacific hurricane set index articles